The 1981 American League Championship Series was a best-of-five series between the New York Yankees and the Oakland Athletics.

Background
Due to a strike-shortened season, each team had to win two playoff series to reach the World Series. Oakland had swept the Kansas City Royals three games to zero and the Yankees had beaten the Milwaukee Brewers three games to two in the 1981 American League Division Series. The Yankees swept the Athletics three games to zero in the ALCS and moved on to the 1981 World Series, where they would lose to the Los Angeles Dodgers.

Summary

Oakland Athletics vs. New York Yankees

Game summaries

Game 1

In Billy Martin's return to Yankee Stadium (for the first time since the Yankees fired him in 1979), the Yankees drew first blood in front of their old skipper.  Graig Nettles' three-run bases-loaded double in the first inning was all the run support that Tommy John needed.

John gave way to Ron Davis after six innings.  Davis had an easy seventh, but the A's mounted a threat in the eighth where Martin tried some of his "Billyball" tactics.  After Dwayne Murphy walked with one out, Davis ran up a 1–2 count on the next batter, Cliff Johnson.  During the at-bat, Johnson stepped in and out of the batter's box (on Martin's orders) on each pitch to break Davis' rhythm.  After fouling off a pitch, Johnson showed his bat to plate umpire Nick Bremigan and asked to get a new one.  Johnson walked slowly to and from the A's dugout in the process, and Bremigan ordered him to get back to the plate more quickly.  This prompted an argument from Johnson and Yankee manager Bob Lemon came out of the dugout as well.  Bremigan then ordered Johnson into the batter's box, but also ordered Davis to resume pitching immediately.  This, in turn, infuriated Davis, who was angry that Johnson had delayed the game so long.  Both Graig Nettles and Lemon tried to calm Davis down, and Bremigan exacerbated the situation by charging Lemon with a mound visit.  A clearly rattled Davis threw two pitches well out of the strike zone, after which Yankee catcher Rick Cerone came out to talk to Davis.  Davis then threw ball four to walk Johnson and called Cerone out again to talk (presumably to give closer Goose Gossage time to warm up).  Martin then stormed out of the dugout to protest Davis' actions.  Lemon then returned from the dugout to the mound and removed Davis (as MLB rules require on a second mound visit in an inning) and brought in Gossage earlier than expected to face Tony Armas.  Armas, the A's leading home run and RBI man in 1981, was now at bat with the tying runs on base with less than 2 outs.  Gossage retired Armas and Wayne Gross to end the inning and closed out the win the rest of the way.

Game 2

The Yankees struck first in Game 2 on Reggie Jackson's RBI groundout in the bottom of the first with runners on first and second off of American League ERA leader Steve McCatty, but Oakland tied the score in the third when Rick Bosetti hit a leadoff double and scored on Rickey Henderson's one-out triple. Next inning, three consecutive one-out singles put Oakland up 2–1 and knock Yankees' starter Rudy May out of the game. George Frazier intentionally walked Keith Drumright before Fred Stanley's RBI single made it 3–1 Oakland, who were poised to tie the series going home. It could have been worse, but Dave Winfield made a leaping catch in the second to rob Tony Armas of a homer.

But, Graig Nettles led off the bottom of the fourth with a single and Rick Cerone was hit by a McCatty pitch with one out. After Willie Randolph singled in Nettles, Jerry Mumphrey walked. Dave Beard came on in relief and proceeded to give up an RBI single to Larry Milbourne, a two-run double to Winfield, and a three-run homer to Lou Piniella. Beard gave up two more hits and loaded the bases after that, but Cerone flied out to end the disastrous inning. The Yankees now led 8–3.

In the sixth, the Yankees added another run on an RBI single by Bob Watson off of Jeff Jones after a walk and hit-by-pitch. Next inning, they loaded the bases on three singles with one out off of Brian Kingman. Oscar Gamble's sacrifice fly scored a run off of Bob Owchinko before Graig Nettles capped the scoring with a three-run home run to make it 13–3 Yankees. Frazier pitched  innings in relief to earn the win as the Yankees took a 2–0 series lead.

Game 3

Prior to the game, Bob Lemon inexplicably dropped Willie Randolph from the leadoff spot in the batting order to ninth.  Randolph kept any ill feelings to himself and broke a scoreless pitching duel between Dave Righetti and Matt Keough with a homer in the sixth.  That run would be all Righetti would need through six innings.  Series MVP Graig Nettles plated three more runs in the ninth with a bases-loaded double resulting when A's center fielder Rick Bosetti turned the wrong way on his fly ball.

Dave Righetti pitched six shutout innings and Ron Davis pitched two scoreless innings before giving way to Goose Gossage, who retired the side in the ninth to clinch the pennant.

The most widely accepted debut of "the wave" occurred during Game 3, led by Krazy George Henderson.

Composite box
1981 ALCS (3–0): New York Yankees over Oakland Athletics

References

External links
1981 ALCS at Baseball-Reference

American League Championship Series
American League Championship Series
Oakland Athletics postseason
New York Yankees postseason
American League Championship Series
20th century in Oakland, California
American League Championship Series
American League Championship Series
Baseball competitions in New York City
Baseball competitions in Oakland, California
1980s in the Bronx